Akhalgori (Leningor) is a town in Georgia, (in the Mtskheta-Mtianeti region according to the official administrative division of Georgia). The name Akhalgori is the original historical name of the town used by the Georgians and officials, whereas Leningori is the name given to the city in the Soviet era and used by the South Ossetians. The town is situated on the banks of the River Ksani, height above sea level - 800 m.

History
The village of Akhalgori was first mentioned in the 18th century by Prince Vakhushti of Kartli in his work The Geographic Description of Georgia. The name derives from the Georgian words meaning "new" (ახალი/akhali) and "hill" or "mountain" (გორა/gora). Before Sovietization of Georgia in 1921, Akhalgori was the residence of Georgian Noble Eristavi Duce. During the Soviet era it was part of the South Ossetian Autonomous Oblast and was called Leningori (Ленингори; ლენინგორი) after Vladimir Lenin. It was renamed Akhalgori by the Georgian SSR government at the end of 1990.

Control over the town
During the 1991–1992 South Ossetia War the town remained under Georgian jurisdiction after most of South Ossetia broke away from the central government's control. It came under the control of South Ossetian secessionist authorities as a result of the 2008 Russo-Georgian War on August 17, 2008. Subsequently, the government of South Ossetia has renamed the town to Leningor.

Before the conflict, Akhalgori district had a population of 7,700, with approximately 2,000 living in the town itself. The largest villages were Ikorta, Korinta, Qanchaveti, Kvemo Zakhori, Largvisi, Doretkari, and Karchokhi. The population was primarily Georgian (6,520) and Ossetian (1,110) with good relations between the two communities. Currently Akhalgori as well as South Ossetia are controlled by Russian forces and South Ossetian militia.

Town's position in administrative subdivision makeup
According to South Ossetian official division, the town is the center of Leningor District of South Ossetia
According to Georgian official division, the town is the municipal center of Akhalgori Municipality in Mtskheta-Mtianeti region, of Georgia

Industry and commerce
Akhalgori is home to the Lomisi brewery, owned by the Turkish company Efes Beverage Group, which is the primary employer of the town.

Climate

Notable people
 Eristavi Noble family
 Manana Chitishvili

See also
 Mtskheta-Mtianeti

References

Notes

Sources
Е. М. Поспелов (Ye. M. Pospelov). "Имена городов: вчера и сегодня (1917–1992). Топонимический словарь." (City Names: Yesterday and Today (1917–1992). Toponymic Dictionary.) Москва, "Русские словари", 1993.

External links

Official Georgian site of the town
Official Ossetian site of the town

Populated places in Akhalgori District
Cities and towns in Mtskheta-Mtianeti
Tiflis Governorate